Syncratus is a genus of moths belonging to the subfamily Tortricinae of the family Tortricidae.

Species
Syncratus paroecus Common, 1965
Syncratus scepanus Common, 1965

See also
List of Tortricidae genera

References

External links
tortricidae.com

Tortricidae genera